The NHL on TNT is an American presentation of National Hockey League (NHL) games produced by Warner Bros. Discovery Sports (formerly known as Turner Sports), and televised on TNT in the United States.

In 2021, Turner Sports reached a seven-year contract to serve as one of the two rightsholders of the NHL in the United States, alongside ESPN/ABC, and both replacing NBC Sports. TNT will hold rights "up to 72" nationally televised regular-season games per season, the annual NHL Winter Classic game on New Year's Day, half of the Stanley Cup playoffs (airing on TNT and TBS, with the latter billed as the NHL on TBS), and hold rights to the Stanley Cup Finals in odd-numbered years. The contract also includes an option for HBO Max to carry and/or simulcast games.

Turner Sports has previously aired hockey, as the regional home for the Atlanta Flames and Atlanta Thrashers, and as the cable home for Olympic ice hockey from 1992–1998 for CBS. The co-owned AT&T SportsNet regional sports networks also hold local rights to the Pittsburgh Penguins, Seattle Kraken, and Vegas Golden Knights. However, Turner Sports never had a national contract with the NHL until the current deal was reached.

History

Prior to a national contract 
From 1992–1998, TNT served as the American cable television partner for CBS in its coverage of the Winter Olympic Games. Jiggs McDonald handled the play-by-play for ice hockey at the 1992 and 1994 Olympics with Bill Clement on color commentary in 1992 and Joe Micheletti in 1994. In 1998, Mike "Doc" Emrick provided the play-by-play commentary alongside color commentators Peter McNab, Joe Micheletti, and Digit Murphy.

When the NHL's media rights were up for renewal in 2011, Turner Sports was reported to have been among the bidders (with Sports Business Journal suggesting that Turner would want to pick it up for TruTV to expand its sports output alongside the NCAA men's basketball tournament), alongside past NHL rightsholders Fox Sports and ESPN. The NHL ultimately decided to renew its rights with NBC Sports under a 10-year deal, taking advantage of the acquisition of its parent company NBC Universal by Comcast—the existing cable rightsholder via Versus.

National contract (2021–present) 
In order to increase the value of its U.S. media rights after the expiration of their ten-year deal with NBC Sports, the NHL pursued having multiple media partners for its next round of media rights deals, including possible deals with streaming services. After announcing on March 10, 2021 that ESPN would hold the first half of the new media rights, on April 27, the NHL announced that a seven-year agreement was reached for Turner Sports to hold the second half of its new media rights beginning in the 2021–22 season;

 TNT holds rights up to 72 regular season games per-season. In practice these games have primarily been Wednesday-night doubleheaders (thus serving as a spiritual successor NBCSN's flagship Wednesday Night Hockey), with occasional games also scheduled on weekends. Other Turner networks, such as TruTV, are used as overflow in the event that a game on TNT runs long.
 TNT holds rights to the Winter Classic annually, as well as the Thanksgiving Showdown, Stadium Series, and Heritage Classic in select years.
 TNT and TBS share in coverage of the Stanley Cup playoffs with ESPN, ESPN2, and ABC, holding rights to "half" of the games in the first two rounds, and one conference final per-season (ESPN/ABC will have the first choice of conference finals).
 TNT will hold rights to the Stanley Cup Finals in odd-numbered years beginning 2023, alternating with ABC.
 There is an option for HBO Max to hold over-the-top streaming rights, including simulcasts of TNT's games, and the option for games exclusive to the service. WarnerMedia executives indicated following the contract announcement that they had only just begun to study how the streaming service might be involved, and that they did not plan to air games on HBO Max within the 2021 calendar year.
 TNT will produce a studio show for its coverage, modeled after Inside the NBA. 
Bleacher Report will distribute highlights on digital platforms. The site launched Open Ice, a new content brand focusing on NHL-related content. Online personality and streamer Andrew "Nasher" Telfer was hired as a contributor for the brand.

The contract was reported to be valued at $225 million per-season.

On May 26, 2021, Turner announced the hiring of Wayne Gretzky as its lead studio analyst, and that NBC's top commentary team of Kenny Albert and Eddie Olczyk moved to Turner as its lead commentary team.  Retired basketball player and current TNT Inside the NBA panelist Charles Barkley, who is a friend of Gretzky, was instrumental in convincing Gretzky to join Turner. Craig Morgan, an Arizona-based reporter on the Arizona Coyotes and correspondent for the NHL Network, reported that Darren Pang and Keith Jones, color commentators for the St. Louis Blues and Philadelphia Flyers, respectively, would be joining Turner. On June 9, Morgan reported that NBC's Anson Carter would be doing the same. On June 28, Marchand reported that Islanders play-by-play man Brendan Burke was in talks to join Turner as their #2 play-by-play man. On August 31, it was reported that Liam McHugh would join TNT from NBC.

On September 14, 2021, TNT announced its slate of on-air staff for its inaugural season. Jones, who served as a studio analyst at NBC, would join Albert and Olczyk on the lead broadcast team as the lead "Inside-the-Glass" reporter. Burke and Pang were named as the secondary broadcast team. McHugh and Carter were named to the studio team, along with former Coyotes head coach Rick Tocchet and veteran Paul Bissonnette, who all joined Gretzky in studio. Hockey Night in Canada’s Jennifer Botterill, NHL Network's Jackie Redmond, and Tarik El-Bashir also appear as contributors. TNT later added former referee Don Koharski as a rules analyst, and former Blackhawk Jamal Mayers as an extra contributor. 

On November 23, TNT added retired Rangers goaltender Henrik Lundqvist to its studio panel, starting on the next day's broadcast. On November 30, TNT welcomed former referee Stéphane Auger to their team, as another rules analyst, joining Koharski. He made his debut during the Penguins-Oilers game the next night. On January 13, 2022, TNT added Nabil Karim, formerly of ESPN, to contribute as secondary studio host and reporter for both the NHL and the NBA. Former NBC and current Kraken play-by-play announcer John Forslund was picked up by TNT as a fill-in announcer, whenever Albert or Burke are on assignment. Forslund first filled in for Albert for the Avalanche-Golden Knights game on February 16, as Albert was working the Olympic women's hockey gold medal game for NBC about an hour after puck drop. Sharks color commentator Bret Hedican also joined in a fill-in role, joining Forslund in Vancouver on March 9. TNT added several announcers to their roster for the playoffs, whose teams that missed the playoffs this season, including Randy Hahn, Dave Goucher, Jim Jackson, Butch Goring, Drew Remenda, Shane Hnidy and Jody Shelley.

For the 2021–22 season, TNT aired 50 games, primarily on Wednesday nights (with 15 doubleheaders), as well as seven weeks of Sunday afternoon games in March and April 2022, and all three outdoor games (the Winter Classic, Stadium Series, and Heritage Classic). TNT's first broadcasts were a preseason doubleheader on September 30, 2021, between the Boston Bruins and Philadelphia Flyers, and the Vegas Golden Knights and Los Angeles Kings. TNT then aired its first regular season games on October 13, 2021, with a doubleheader between the New York Rangers and Washington Capitals, and the Chicago Blackhawks and Colorado Avalanche.

Due to conflicts with TNT's first two NHL doubleheaders, AEW: Dynamite was pre-empted to Saturday on the weeks of October 13 and 20. From October 27 through December 15, 2021, TNT aired only a single, 10 p.m. ET game with Dynamite as a lead-in (which concurrently began broadcasting live on both TNT's East and West feeds). TNT then began airing doubleheaders on January 5, 2022, when Dynamite moved to TBS.

In the 2022–23 season, TNT announced a 62-game regular season schedule, normally airing on Wednesdays throughout the regular season and on four Sundays during March and April. In addition to gaining exclusive rights to the 2023 Stanley Cup Finals and the 2023 NHL Winter Classic, TNT will gain the rights to the annual Thanksgiving Showdown on Friday, November 25, featuring a doubleheader between the Pittsburgh Penguins and the Philadelphia Flyers, and the St. Louis Blues at the Tampa Bay Lightning. With the NBA opting to not play games on Election Day, TNT decided to schedule a rare Tuesday night doubleheader on November 8, with the Edmonton Oilers at the Tampa Bay Lightning, followed by the Nashville Predators at the Seattle Kraken. Like their playoff coverage in 2022, TNT brought in regional announcers for select games. Those include current Kings and former NBC play-by-play man Alex Faust and Lightning play-by-play man Dave Randorf, previously of TSN and Sportsnet/Hockey Night in Canada. Unlike the previous season, select TNT broadcasts would air on a non-exclusive basis, and are blacked out in the local markets of the participating teams in favor of local broadcasters. On January 23, Tocchet left TNT to be the new head coach of the Vancouver Canucks, replacing recently-fired Bruce Boudreau.

Coverage on other networks
Turner Sports produced hockey has also aired on other networks.

TBS

For a short period in the 1970s, WTCG, the predecessor to TBS, was the television home of the Atlanta Flames. All of the Flames' radio and television broadcasts were simulcasts. The Flames' games were also broadcast on the radio by WSB (AM). Jiggs McDonald was the main play-by-play announcer with Skip Caray substituting from 1976–80. Color commentators included Andy Still (1972-73), Bob Neal (1973–74), Ed Thilenius (1974–75; home and televised games only), Bernie Geoffrion (1975–79), and Bobby Harper (1979–80; home games only). Pete Van Wieren also did play-by-play for the Flames. The Flames left Atlanta for Calgary prior to the 1980–81 NHL season.

During the Stanley Cup Playoffs, TBS airs select playoff games alongside TNT.

Turner South

Turner launched the regional Turner South network in 1999, which carried games of the Atlanta Thrashers, which were owned at that time by Turner parent Time Warner. Matt McConnell was the primary television play-by-play announcer for the Thrashers from 1999–2003 with JP Dellacamera taking over for the rest of the way in Atlanta. Darren Eliot was the television color commentator throughout the Thrashers' entire existence before their 2011 departure to Winnipeg as the Jets. Time Warner sold the Thrashers in 2003, and sold Turner South to Fox Cable Networks in 2006, which merged it with FSN South to form SportSouth.

AT&T SportsNet

Following AT&T's acquisition of Time Warner in 2018, AT&T SportsNet,—a regional sports network system acquired in 2015 as a part of DirecTV, and formerly part of the Fox Sports Networks (FSN) group—was moved alongside Turner Sports within the WarnerMedia News & Sports division under Jeff Zucker in March 2019. AT&T SportsNet Pittsburgh, AT&T SportsNet Rocky Mountain, and Root Sports Northwest (majority owned by the Seattle Mariners) currently serve as the regional outlets for the Pittsburgh Penguins, Vegas Golden Knights, and Seattle Kraken, respectively.

Production 
A Turner Sports executive stated that TNT's goal for its coverage was to provide information on-air that would appeal to both mainstream viewers and "diehard fans", including leveraging the NHL's new player and puck tracking system for on-air features and graphics, and high frame rate cameras. The network also implemented an on-ice graphic for the power play clock, similar to the on-court shot clock graphic used in TNT's NBA coverage. TNT's studio coverage originates from Turner's headquarters in Atlanta, with a set featuring projection mapping effects.

On-air staff

Studio personalities
 Liam McHugh: lead studio host (2021–present)
 Nabil Karim: ice-level reporter and fill-in studio host (2022–present)
 Anson Carter: studio analyst (2021–present)
 Paul Bissonnette: studio analyst (2021–present)
 Rick Tocchet: studio analyst (2021–2023)
 Wayne Gretzky: studio analyst and Heritage Classic color commentator (2021–present)
 Henrik Lundqvist: fill-in studio analyst (2021–present)
 Keith Jones: lead "Inside-the-Glass" analyst, occasional color commentator, and fill-in studio analyst (2021–present)
 Darren Pang: #2 color commentator, "Inside-the-Glass" analyst, and fill-in studio analyst (2021–present)
 Jennifer Botterill: #2 color commentator, "Inside-the-Glass" analyst, and fill-in studio analyst (2021–present)
 Colby Armstrong: fill-in "Inside-the-Glass" and studio analyst (2022–present)
 Keith Yandle: fill-in studio analyst (2022–present)
 Sarah Nurse: guest studio analyst (2023-present)

Play-by-play
 Kenny Albert: lead play-by-play (2021–present)
 Brendan Burke: #2 play-by-play (2021–present)
 John Forslund: #3 play-by-play (2022–present)
 Dave Randorf: fill-in play-by-play (2022–present)
 Alex Faust: fill-in play-by-play (2022–present)
 Randy Hahn: Playoffs play-by-play (2022–present)
 Dave Goucher: Playoffs play-by-play (2022–present)
 Jim Jackson: Playoffs play-by-play (2022–present)

Color commentators
 Eddie Olczyk: lead color commentator (2021–present)
 Keith Jones: lead "Inside-the-Glass" analyst, occasional color commentator, and studio analyst (2021–present)
 Jennifer Botterill: #2 color commentator, "Inside-the-Glass" analyst, and fill-in studio analyst (2021–present)
 Darren Pang: #2 color commentator, "Inside-the-Glass" analyst, and fill-in studio analyst (2021–present)
 Bret Hedican: #3 color commentator (2022–present)
 Wayne Gretzky: studio analyst and Heritage Classic color commentator (2021–present)
 Shane Hnidy: fill-in color commentator and "Inside-the-Glass" analyst (2022–present)
 Jody Shelley: fill-in color commentator (2022–present)
 Butch Goring: Playoffs color commentator (2022–present)
 Drew Remenda: Playoffs color commentator (2022–present)

Inside-the-Glass analysts
 Keith Jones: lead "Inside-the-Glass" analyst, occasional color commentator, and studio analyst (2021–present)
 Darren Pang: #2 color commentator, "Inside-the-Glass" analyst, and fill-in studio analyst (2021–present)
 Jennifer Botterill: #2 color commentator, "Inside-the-Glass" analyst, and fill-in studio analyst (2021–present)
 Jamal Mayers: fill-in "Inside-the-Glass" analyst (2021–present)
 Shane Hnidy: fill-in color commentator and "Inside-the-Glass" analyst (2022–present)
 Jean-Luc Grand-Pierre: fill-in "Inside-the-Glass" analyst (2022–present)
 Colby Armstrong: fill-in "Inside-the-Glass" and studio analyst (2022–present)
 Bryce Salvador: Playoffs "Inside-the-Glass" analyst (2022–present)
 Darren Eliot: Playoffs "Inside-the-Glass" analyst (2022–present)
 Meaghan Mikkelson: Playoffs "Inside-the-Glass" analyst and ice-level reporter (2022–present)
 Mike McKenna: Playoffs "Inside-the-Glass" analyst (2022–present)

Ice-level reporters
 Tarik El-Bashir: ice-level reporter (2021–present)
 Jackie Redmond: ice-level reporter (2022–present)
 Nabil Karim: ice-level reporter and fill-in studio host (2022–present)
 Kathryn Tappen: fill-in ice-level reporter (2022–present)
 Taryn Hatcher: Playoffs ice-level reporter (2022–present)
 Erika Wachter: Playoffs ice-level reporter (2022–present)
 Shannon Hogan: Playoffs ice-level reporter (2022–present)
 Julie Stewart-Binks: Playoffs ice-level reporter (2022–present)
 Ashali Vise: Playoffs ice-level reporter (2022–present)
 Alyson Lozoff: Playoffs ice-level reporter (2022–present)
 Meaghan Mikkelson: Playoffs "Inside-the-Glass" analyst and ice-level reporter (2022–present)

Rules analysts
 Don Koharski (2021–present)
 Stéphane Auger (2021–present)

See also 
 National Hockey League on television
 NHL on SportsChannel America

References

External links

Turner Sports
National Hockey League on television
TNT (American TV network)
TNT (American TV network) original programming
TBS (American TV channel) original programming
2020s American television series
2021 American television series debuts
Sports telecast series